Gregory Avedon (born ) is a former model and fitness personality.

Avedon modelled for Giorgio Armani, Dolce & Gabbana, Krizia, Trussardi and Valentino Garavani. He appeared in several magazines and catalogs, including 18 times on the cover of Men's Health.

Filmography

Works

References

External links 
 Official Site
 

Living people
1960s births
Male models from Florida
Writers from Miami
American exercise instructors
American exercise and fitness writers
Sportspeople from Florida
People from Weston, Florida